Camptosphaeria is a genus of fungi within the Lasiosphaeriaceae family.

References

External links
Camptosphaeria at Index Fungorum

Lasiosphaeriaceae